Sir John Herbert Lewis  (27 December 1858 – 10 November 1933) was a Welsh Liberal politician.

Background and education
Born at Mostyn Quay, Flintshire, Lewis was the only child of Enoch Lewis and Catherine Roberts. It is possible that Lewis was related to C.S. Lewis. This speculation is the result of the fact that C.S. Lewis's grandfather, Richard Lewis, was born in Flintshire in 1775. He was educated at McGill University and Exeter College, Oxford.

Political career
Lewis was the first Chairman of Flintshire County Council. He was Member of Parliament MP for Flint Boroughs 1892–1906. In 1894, he resigned the Liberal Whip in the so-called 'Welsh Revolt', joining David Alfred Thomas, David Lloyd George and Frank Edwards. In a letter to T. E. Ellis, Lewis wrote to his friend, then Chief Whip: 'I will never again fight a constituency as an official Liberal.' Although he later recanted, this episode was illustrative of Herbert Lewis' moral seriousness. With Lloyd George, Lewis was an enthusiastic supporter of Cymru Fydd, a nationalist movement within Welsh Liberalism. Along with Lloyd George and David Alfred Thomas, he opposed the Boer War at the 1900 General Election. He was elected for Flintshire in 1906; 

Lewis was a Lord of the Treasury, 1905–1908. He was re-elected twice in 1910, the second time unopposed;

Lewis was Parliamentary Secretary to the Local Government Board, 1909–1915. He was Parliamentary Secretary to the Board of Education, 1915–1922, and played a key role in drawing up the Education Act 1918, often known as the Fisher Act. 
At the 1918 general election he contested the new University of Wales constituency as a Coalition Liberal;

He was offered a peerage on his retirement from Parliament in 1922, but declined the honour. He was appointed a Knight Grand Cross of the Order of the British Empire (GBE) in the 1922 Dissolution Honours List.

Lewis was made a Privy Counsellor in 1912, a freeman of the towns of Flint and Aberystwyth, Constable of Flint Castle, honorary LL.D of the University of Wales in 1918. He was awarded the gold medal of the Honourable Society of Cymmrodorion in 1927.

Lewis was a keen supporter of the National Library of Wales, located in Aberystwyth. In 1909 he became a Vice President of the Library. In 1925, while walking in the hills above the town prior to a meeting of the Library's council, Lewis suffered a fall down a quarry which left him paralyzed for the rest of his life. Although elected President of the Library in 1926, this was a largely honorific appointment.

An active lay member of the Calvinistic Methodist Connexion, Lewis was elected Moderator of the denomination in 1925, although he declined the post. He was an interested correspondent in the trial for unorthodoxy of Thomas Williams (Tom Nefyn). Among his other correspondents in religious matters was the Welsh Revivalist Evan Roberts.

Personal life
Sir John Herbert Lewis was married twice, first in 1886 to Adelaide (d. 1895), daughter of Charles Hughes, publisher, Wrexham and in 1897 to Ruth, daughter of Alice and W. S. Caine, MP. By his second marriage he had a son and a daughter. He resided at Plas Penucha, Caerwys, Flintshire. Lewis died at his home, Plas Penucha, in 1933.

Notes

References 
 National Library of Wales: Sir John Herbert Lewis Papers
 National Library of Wales: Lloyd George Papers
 National Library of Wales: T. E. Ellis Papers
 Dictionary of Welsh Biography

Further reading

External links 
 

1858 births
1933 deaths
Members of Flintshire County Council
Knights Grand Cross of the Order of the British Empire
Members of the Privy Council of the United Kingdom
Liberal Party (UK) MPs for Welsh constituencies
McGill University alumni
Members of the Parliament of the United Kingdom for the University of Wales
Politicians awarded knighthoods
UK MPs 1892–1895
UK MPs 1895–1900
UK MPs 1900–1906
UK MPs 1906–1910
UK MPs 1910
UK MPs 1910–1918
UK MPs 1918–1922
Liberal Party (UK) councillors